The Western Theater Commandis one of the five theater commands of the People's Liberation Army, founded on 1 February 2016.

Its jurisdiction includes Sichuan, Tibet, Gansu, Ningxia, Qinghai, Xinjiang,   Shaanxi, Yunnan, Chongqing. Guizhou is also sometimes listed as part of the command. Its current commander since August 2021 is General Wang Haijiang. Its current political commissar is General Li Fengbiao.

In May 2016, the PRC raised the rank and status of its western Tibet Military Command to widen its scope for missions and combat preparedness, in a move analysts in Beijing said was aimed in part at fortifying the border with India. The Xinjiang Military Command may also be elevated in the future, the report said. Both commands are under the newly created Western Theater Command, the largest of five newly reorganised military regions of the PLA. The Chinese Communist Party-run tabloid Global Times reported the change would allow the command “to shoulder more combat assignments”.

In 2012 the 109th Aviation Regiment was reorganised as a brigade reporting to the PLAAF's Urumqi Base. It now flies the Shenyang J-11 fighter.

Area of Responsibility (AOR) 
Western Theater Command's Area of Responsibility (AOR) consists of India, South Asia, Central Asia, Western Mongolia, Pakistan and Afghanistan

Organizational structure 
The Western Theater Command consists of the following components:

 Western Theater Command Ground Force
 Western Theater Command Air Force
 33rd Fighter Division
 44th Fighter Division
 6th Fighter Division
 36th Bomber Division
 37th Fighter Division
 4th Transport Division

Official hymn 
Released on 4 November 2020, the Western Theater Command released "The Battle Hymn of the Western Theater Command" with lyrics written by the then commander of the Western Theater Command, General Zhao Zongqi and music composed by Luan Kai.

See also 
 Western Theater Command Ground Force
 Western Theater Command Air Force
 East, Central and Western Command LAC, of India
 China–India relations
 Line of Actual Control 
 List of People's Liberation Army Air Force airbases
 List of Indian Air Force stations 
 Sino-Indian border dispute
 Indo-Tibetan Border Police
 India-China Border Roads

References

Further reading
 
 Kevin McCauley, Snapshot: China’s Western Theater Command, China Brief Volume: 17 Issue: 1, Jamestown Foundation, 2017.
 Rupprecht, Andreas: Flashpoint China, Chinese air power and regional security; Harpia Publishing, 2016 

 
Theater commands of the People's Liberation Army
Military units and formations established in 2016
2016 establishments in China